The Ejinhoro Formation is a geological formation in Inner Mongolia, north China, whose strata date back to the Early Cretaceous period (Aptian/Albian age.

Dinosaur remains are among the fossils that have been recovered from the formation.

Fossil content

Mammals

Dinosaurs

Pterosaurs 
Indeterminate pterosaur remains have also been recovered from the formation.

See also 
 List of dinosaur-bearing rock formations

References 

Geologic formations of China
Lower Cretaceous Series of Asia
Cretaceous China
Albian Stage
Aptian Stage
Sandstone formations
Fossiliferous stratigraphic units of Asia
Paleontology in Inner Mongolia